Asım Pars (born Asim Paščanović; 1 April 1976) is a Turkish professional basketball player. He stands 2.11 m tall and plays as a center. He has dual citizenship, Turkish and Bosnian.

References

External links
TBLStat.net Profile
TurkSports.Net Profile
European Cup Statistics

1976 births
Living people
People from Kalesija
Anadolu Efes S.K. players
Bosnia and Herzegovina emigrants to Turkey
Bosniaks of Bosnia and Herzegovina
Centers (basketball)
Fenerbahçe men's basketball players
Galatasaray S.K. (men's basketball) players
Karşıyaka basketball players
Mersin Büyükşehir Belediyesi S.K. players
Naturalized citizens of Turkey
Tofaş S.K. players
Tuborg Pilsener basketball players
Turkish expatriate basketball people
Turkish expatriate basketball people in Russia
Turkish men's basketball players
Turkish people of Bosniak descent
Türk Telekom B.K. players
Ülker G.S.K. basketball players
2002 FIBA World Championship players